Jocelyn Joseph (born 11 February 1964) is an Antigua and Barbuda sprinter. She competed in the women's 200 metres at the 1988 Summer Olympics.

References

External links
 

1964 births
Living people
Athletes (track and field) at the 1983 Pan American Games
Athletes (track and field) at the 1987 Pan American Games
Athletes (track and field) at the 1984 Summer Olympics
Athletes (track and field) at the 1988 Summer Olympics
Antigua and Barbuda female sprinters
Olympic athletes of Antigua and Barbuda
Pan American Games competitors for Antigua and Barbuda
Place of birth missing (living people)
Olympic female sprinters